Akhethetep was an ancient Egyptian official mainly known from his mastaba found at Saqqara (no. E 17 ). Not much is known about Akhethetep. On the reliefs of his mastaba he bears several titles, including overseer of the great house. This was an administrative title of rather unclear function. He had also several religious titles, including priest of Maat and priest of Hathor, lady of Dendera. He had also priestly functions at the funerary cult of different kings and was Priest of Nefer-Djedkare (this is the name of the pyramid of king Djedkare and priest at Nefersut-Unas (name of the pyramid of king Unas). 

The exact dating of Akhethetep is uncertain, but he might belong to the end of the 5th or to the beginning of the 6th Dynasty.

References

Literature 

People of the Fifth Dynasty of Egypt
People of the Sixth Dynasty of Egypt
Ancient Egyptian priests